Alexandre Lloveras (born 26 June 2000) is a French para-cyclist who represented France at the 2020 Summer Paralympics.

Career
Lloveras represented France in the men's road time trial B event at the 2020 Summer Paralympics and won a gold medal.

References

External links
 
 

Living people
2000 births
French male cyclists
Cyclists from Lyon
Cyclists at the 2020 Summer Paralympics
Medalists at the 2020 Summer Paralympics
Paralympic medalists in cycling
Paralympic gold medalists for France
Paralympic cyclists of France
21st-century French people